Alex James Denis Scott (born 4 May 1990) is a Hongkonger former first-class cricketer.

Scott was born in British Hong Kong in May 1990. He later studied in England at Keble College, Oxford. While studying at Oxford he played first-class cricket for both Oxford University and Oxford MCCU from 2010–11, making four appearances. Three of these were for Oxford University against Cambridge University in The University Match, in addition to one match for Oxford MCCU against Sussex. Playing as a right-arm off break bowler, he took 16 wickets at an average of 19.25 and best figures of 4 for 52. 8 of these wickets came in The University Match of 2010.

Notes and references

External links

1990 births
Living people
Hong Kong people
Alumni of Keble College, Oxford
Hong Kong cricketers
Oxford University cricketers
Oxford MCCU cricketers